Deportivo Real Tlamazolan is a Mexican professional football team based in Ciudad Guzmán, Jalisco, Mexico currently playing in Liga de Balompié Mexicano.

History
The team was founded in June 2021 to take part in the Liga de Balompié Mexicano starting in August.

On August 22, 2021, the team played its first official match, defeating Neza F.C. by a score of 1–4. Santiago Giraldo scored the first goal in the club's history.

Stadium
Real Tlamazolan plays its home games at the Estadio Olímpico de Ciudad Guzmán, which has an approximate capacity for 3,000 spectators.

Players

First-team squad

References

Association football clubs established in 2021
2021 establishments in Mexico
Football clubs in Jalisco
Liga de Balompié Mexicano Teams